Keith Tucker is a DJ and producer of Detroit techno and electro music from Detroit, Michigan.

Career

Tucker began his career playing cover versions of Juan Atkins' electro hits from the 1980s with his childhood friend Tommy Hamilton. The live ensemble achieved local renown for combining break-dancing, and Tucker's mobile DJing while manually playing repetitive, high-speed synthesizer basslines. They later became known as Regime, then RX-7, and finally, in 1994 they became Aux 88. They were joined by BJ Smith (Posatronix) and Lamont Norwood (DJ Dijital).

Tucker's first 12" EP was a collaboration with Juan Atkins and Jesse Anderson, under the name "Frequency" in 1990. Aux 88 released the album "Bass Magnetic" and were the first group to revive Electro in the mid-to-late 1990s. As such they have been credited with eventually inspiring the genre known as electroclash. In the mid-1990s they described their own sound as Techno-Bass, a fusion of influences from Detroit techno, electro, Miami bass.

As co-founder of Puzzlebox recordings in 1996 with Anthony "Shake" Shakir, Tucker also joined the tradition of independent dance music publishing and vinyl record pressing in Detroit. He utilized, along with other artists, the National Sound Company vinyl lathe which was used to produce the records of legendary Detroit Soul labels such as Motown.

In 2006, Tucker's song "Plastic People" was featured on the DJ mix album A Bugged Out Mix by Miss Kittin, which charted at number one-hundred seventy on the French Albums Chart.

Music
Among his influences, he cites 1970s Funk such as Parliament, Kraftwerk and classical music, particularly Johann Sebastian Bach. The distinction of his solo work and production credits, is in their blending and refinement of syncopated, minimalist Electro and Techno rhythms influenced by the tonal undulations of Miami Bass and the Roland TR-808 drum machine.

True to the Detroit techno tradition, Tucker's music is often emotive of a machine-like consciousness and a mental imagery of solipsism, urban alienation and decay. This is often expressed, masked or sublimated through metaphors of high technology, science fiction and space travel and conveyed through affected analogue synthesizer timbres. This harks back to Kraftwerk's description of their music – "Electronic blues made with a jazz improvisation technique.”

References

External links
 optic-universe.com – Keith Tucker's website Optic Universe
 aux88.com – official website of AUX 88
 
 
 Keith Tucker at Last.fm

Year of birth missing (living people)
Living people
Musicians from Detroit
American techno musicians